The 1994 NCAA Division I-AA Football Championship Game was a postseason college football game between the Youngstown State Penguins and the Boise State Broncos. The game was played on December 17, 1994, at Marshall University Stadium in Huntington, West Virginia. The culminating game of the 1994 NCAA Division I-AA football season, it was won by Youngstown State, 28–14.

Teams
The participants of the Championship Game were the finalists of the 1994 I-AA Playoffs, which began with a 16-team bracket. The site of the title game, Marshall University Stadium, had been determined in March 1994.

Youngstown State Penguins

Youngstown State finished their regular season with a 10–0–1 record. The only game they did not win was a season opening tie with Stephen F. Austin. One of their wins was a 17–14 victory over the defending NCAA Division II champion North Alabama Lions. Seeded first in the playoffs, the Penguins defeated Alcorn State, Eastern Kentucky, and Montana to reach the final. This was the fourth appearance, both consecutively and overall, for Youngstown State in a Division I-AA championship game, having won in 1991 and 1993, and having lost in 1992.

Boise State Broncos

Boise State finished their regular season with a 10–1 record (6–1 in conference). Their only loss came in an away game at Idaho State. The Broncos, seeded third, defeated North Texas, Appalachian State, and second-seed Marshall to reach the final. This was the second appearance for Boise State in a Division I-AA championship game, having won in 1980.

Game summary

Scoring summary

Game statistics

References

Further reading

External links
1994 NCAA 1-AA National Championship - Boise State vs Youngstown State via YouTube

Championship Game
NCAA Division I Football Championship Games
Boise State Broncos football games
Youngstown State Penguins football games
American football in West Virginia
Sports competitions in West Virginia
Sports in Huntington, West Virginia
NCAA Division I-AA Football Championship Game
NCAA Division I-AA Football Championship Game